Serapion was a martyr during the reign of Emperor Septimius Severus. An Oriental Martyr and celebrated among the Greeks, Serapion converted many pagans, and in the end was arrested and died at the stake. He is believed to have been put to death in Macedonia, in 195.

References

Saints of Roman Macedonia
195 deaths
2nd-century Christian martyrs
Year of birth unknown